Nadine Lynette Garner (born 14 December 1970 in Knoxfield, Melbourne) is an Australian actress who started her career as a teen performer.

Biography

Garner first came to public attention in 1985, as Tamara Henderson in the Australian TV series The Henderson Kids and then in her debut film, The Still Point. She made her stage debut in 1987 in the title role of the Melbourne Theatre Company production of A Day in the Death of Joe Egg. Since then she has worked extensively in film, theatre and TV (both in Australia and the UK) and received awards and nominations for performances in each field. Also interested in writing, she wrote and performed in the stage work Birds Eye View in Sydney in 2002.

Garner has worked with most state theatre companies in a wide variety of roles in works by Shakespeare, Molière, Sheridan, Ibsen, Ziegler, Chekhov, Orton, Shaffer, Lawler and Elton. She also played the role of Desire in the highly controversial Australian musical Bad Boy Johnny and the Prophets of Doom.

Personal life
Garner was married to Cameron Barnett, and they have two sons: Eden (born 2006) and Jem. In 2018 she revealed that she and Barnett were divorced. She grew up in the Melbourne suburb of Knoxfield.

TV work

Garner's first major role was in 1985 at age 15 as Tamara in The Henderson Kids, for which she won several awards. This was followed by a role in the Australian teen drama Blue Water High.

Garner played Arlene Toomer in the BBC comedy series Boys from the Bush for two series in 1991/92. She has since had a series of minor and guest roles in multiple Australian and British television series, including Prisoner, My Brother Tom miniseries, Neighbours, The Bill, A Country Practice, The Flying Doctors, Shadows of the Heart miniseries, G.P., Twisted Tales, Good Guys Bad Guys, Raw FM, Tribe miniseries, Class Act, Water Rats, The Love of Lionel's Life telemovie, Changi miniseries – Ep.5, Heroes' Mountain telemovie, Young Lions, The Secret Life of Us, Stingers, My Life Is Murder and Through My Eyes miniseries.

Garner played the regular role of Detective Senior Constable Jennifer Mapplethorpe in the police drama series City Homicide, from 2007 to 2011.  Starting in February 2013, she appeared as Jean Beazley, the housekeeper, in The Doctor Blake Mysteries with Craig McLachlan.

In September 2013, Garner appeared as Eve in episode four of the ABC1 television comedy series It's a Date.

Film work

Garner made her film debut in The Still Point (1986) and appeared in Bushfire Moon (1987), Mull (1988) (for which she won "Best Actress" in the 1988 Australian Film Institute Awards), Metal Skin (1994), Fresh Air (1999), The Book of Revelation (2006), and Razzle Dazzle: A Journey into Dance (2007).

In 2002–03, Garner played in a national tour of the musical Cabaret and received enthusiastic reviews—as well as two theatre awards—for her performance as "Fraulein Kost/Fritzi". In 2010, she returned to film, appearing in The Wedding Party.

Filmography

Television
{| class="wikitable sortable"
! Year
! scope="col" | Title
! Role
! class="unsortable" | Notes
|-
| rowspan=3| 1985
| Neighbours
| Recurring role: Rachel Burns
| TV series, 4 episodes
|-
| The Henderson Kids
| Regular lead role: Tamara 'Tammy' Henderson
| TV series, 24 episodes
|-
| Prisoner
| Guest role: Young Girl
| TV series, 1 episode: 526
|-
|rowspan=3|1986
|  My Brother Tom
| Recurring role: Jean Quayle
| TV mini-series, 2 episodes
|-
| A Country Practice
| Guest role: Bonnie Stewart
| TV series, 2 episodes: Growing Pains Part 1/2
|-
| The Flying Doctors
| Guest role: Amanda
| TV series, 1 episode Season 1, episode 12: "E.T - New Girl In Town"
|-
| 1987
| The Henderson Kids II
| Regular lead role: Tamara 'Tam' Henderson
| TV series, 24 episodes
|-
|rowspan=2|1988
| House Rules
| Regular role: Sophie
| ABC TV series, 24 episodes
|-
| The Factory
| Herself - Guest
| ABC TV series, 1 episode
|-
|rowspan=2|1989
| The Flying Doctors
| Guest role: Judy McKenzie 
| TV series, 1 episode, Season 5, episode 22: "Blues For Judy"
|-
| All The Way
| Guest role
| TV series, 1 episode
|-
| 1990
| Shadows of the Heart
| Recurring role: Lanty Fargo
| TV mini-series, 2 episodes
|-
|rowspan=5|1991
| All Together Now
| Guest role: Karen Moyer
| TV series, 1 episode, Season 1, episode 7: "I Want To Be Bobby's Girl"
|-
| A Country Practice
| Donna Hume
| TV series, 2 episodes: For All The Good Times Part 1/2
|-
| Boys From The Bush
| Regular role: Arlene Toomer
| TV series, 20 episodes
|-
| Higher Education Contribution Scheme
| Herself 
| training film
|-
| Tonight Live With Steve Vizard
| Herself - Guest
| TV series, 1 episode
|-
|rowspan=2|1992
| Andrew Denton: Live And Sweaty
| Herself - Guest
| ABC TV series, 1 episode
|-
| Vidiot
| Herself - Guest 
| ABC TV series, 1 episode
|-
|rowspan=3|1993
| Cluedo
| Guest role
| TV series, 1 episode
|-
| Phoenix
| Guest role: Lindy
| ABC TV series, 1 episode, Season 2, episode 5: "Inside Information"
|-
| Secrets
| Guest role
| ABC TV series, 1 episode
|-
| 1994;1995
| Ernie And Denise
| Herself - Guest
| TV series, 2 episodes
|-
| 1994
| Under the Skin
| Role unknown
| SBS TV film series, 1 episode 1: "Dino, Where You Been"
|-
| 1994
| Good Morning Australia
| Herself - Guest
| TV series, 5 episodes
|-
| 1994
| Jimeoin
| Herself - Guest
| TV series, 1 episode
|-
| 1994
| TVTV
| Herself
| ABC TV series, 1 episode
|-
| 1994
| Hey Hey It's Saturday
| Herself - Guest
| TV series, 1 episode
|-
| 1994
| Level 23
| Herself - Guest
| TV series, 1 episode
|-
|1994–1995
| Class Act
| Regular role: Gloria O'Grady
| TV series UK, 14 episodes
|-
| 1994
| The Melbourne Cup Carnival
| Herself - Guest
| TV special
|-
| 1995
| Ernie And Denise
| Herself - Guest
| TV series, 1 episode
|-
| 1995-2003
| Good Morning Australia
| Herself - Guest
| TV series
|-
| 1995
| The Making of 'Metal Skin'''
| Herself
| TV special
|-
|rowspan=2|1996
| G.P.| Guest role
| ABC TV series, 1 episode
|-
| Recovery| Herself - Guest
| ABC TV series, 1 episode
|-
|rowspan=3|1997
| Twisted Tales| Lead role: Mallory
| TV film series, 1 episode 6: "The Crossing" 
|-
| Recovery| Herself - Guest
| ABC TV series, 1 episode
|-
| Raw FM| Regular role: Zelda Lee
| ABC TV series, 13 episodes
|-
| 1998
| The Movie Show| Herself with Marin Mimica & Bridie Carter
| SBS TV series, 1 episode
|-
|rowspan=5|1999
| Tribe| Recurring role:Marie Sinclair
| TV miniseries, 4 episodes
|-
| Recovery| Herself - Guest
| ABC TV series, 1 episode
|-
| Denise| Herself - Guest
| TV series, 1 episode
|-
| Jumpstart| Herself - Guest
| TV series, 1 episode
|-
| GNW Night Lite| Herself - Guest
| TV series, 1 episode
|-
| 2000
|Water Rats| Guest role: Shelley Andrews
| TV series, 1 episode, Season 5, episode 2: "Obsession"
|-
|rowspan=2|2001
| Flat Chat| Herself
| ABC series, 1 episode "Nick's Birthday"
|-
| Changi| Recurring role: Lisa
| ABC TV miniseries, 1 episode
|-
| 2002
|Young Lions| Recurring Guest role: Rebecca Ann Sharpe
| TV series, 2 episodes: "Kickboxer Kills Racist"; "Kickboxer On Trial"
|-
| 2003
| Liquid Assets| Herself - Former Co-Star
| TV series, 1 episode
|-
|rowspan=4|2004
| Through My Eyes: The True Story of Lindy Chamberlain| Sally Lowe
| TV miniseries, 2 episodes
|-
| George Negus Tonight| Herself - Guest
| ABC TV series, 1 episode
|-
|Stingers| Guest role: Evelyn Ballantyne
| TV series, 1 episode, Season 8, episode 9: "House Of Mirrors"
|-
| Petal To The Metal: The Making of 'Metal Skin'| Herself
| Video
|-
| 2005
| The Secret Life of Us| Recurring role: Anna
| 2 episodes: "Dead Man Walking"; "Kicking The Habit"
|-
| 2005–2006
| Blue Water High| Regular role: Deborah Callum / Deb
| ABC TV series, 27 episodes
|-
| 2007–2011
| City Homicide| Regular role: Detective Senior Constable Jennifer Mapplethorpe
| TV series, 84 episodes
|-
| 2007
| Dancing With The Stars| Herself - Audience member
| TV series, 1 episode
|-
| 2008
| 9am with David & Kim| Herself - Guest
| TV series, 1 episode
|-
| 2008
| Mornings With Kerri-Anne| Herself - Guest
| TV series, 1 episode
|-
| 2012
| 1st AACTA Awards| Herself - Screenplay
| TV special
|-
|rowspan=2|2013
| Slideshow| Herself
| TV series, 1 episode
|-
| It's a Date| Guest role: Eve
| ABC TV series, 1 episode 4: "Do Opposites Attract?"
|-
| 2013–2017
| The Doctor Blake Mysteries| Regular role: Jean Beazley
| ABC TV series, 46 episodes
|-
| 2014
| Farmland Not Gaslands| Herself - Voice
| Short film documentary
|-
|rowspan=2| 2017
| News Breakfast| Herself - Guest
| ABC TV series, 1 episode
|-
| Shakespeare Republic| Lead role: Viola
| TV series, 1 episode, Season 2, episode 4: "Viola"
|-
|rowspan=3| 2019
| Mr. Black
| Recurring role: Rowena Black
| TV series, 2 episodes 
|-
| My Life Is Murder| Katrina Logan
| TV series, 1 episode, Season 1, episode 8: "Remains To Be Seen"
|-
| Part-Time Private Eyes| Regular role: Karen
| TV series, 2 episodes
|-
|rowspan=2|2020
| The F Word: International Women's Day| Herself
| TV special
|-
| Bloom| Regular role: Julie Cole
| TV series, 4 episodes
|-
|rowspan=2|2021
| Lie With Me| Regular role: Detective Taormina
| TV miniseries, 4 episodes
|-
| The Morning Show| Herself - Guest
| TV series, 1 episode
|-
| 2022
| Savage River
| Lynne Anderson
| ABC TV series, 6 episodes
|}

Television film

Short film

Film

Awards and nominations

References

External links
 
 Lunch with Nadine Garner. Sydney Morning Herald'', February 9, 2013
 City Homicide Official Website

1970 births
Living people
Actresses from Melbourne
Australian child actresses
Australian stage actresses
Australian television actresses
Best Actress AACTA Award winners
Helpmann Award winners
Logie Award winners
People from the City of Knox